Kim Rose is the current State Representative for the 118th House District in Milford, Connecticut. Previously serving as Vice-Chair of the local Planning & Zoning Board, Rose was elected as State Representative in 2010. The 118th encompasses constituents from both parts Milford and the village of Devon.

In the Connecticut House of Representatives Rose serves as the Assistant Majority Whip, Vice Chairwoman of the Housing Committee and on Veterans' Affairs Committee and the Internship Committee.  She was elected in 2015 to Co-Chair the Bipartisan Women's Caucus.

In 2012 Rose handily won against her Republican opponent and was re-elected again in 2014.
In 2016 Kim Rose was reelected to her 4th term garnering 57.6% of the vote to beat out her opponent Rick Varrone.

References

Living people
Connecticut Democrats
People from Milford, Connecticut
21st-century American politicians
Year of birth missing (living people)